Quintus Fabricius (fl. 1st century BC) was a Roman Senator who was appointed suffect consul in 2 BC.

Biography
Quintus Fabricius is suspected to have been either the son or grandson of the Quintus Fabricius who was a Plebeian Tribune in 57 BC.

A long-standing supporter of the party of Augustus, his loyalty was rewarded in 2 BC when the events that led to the banishment of Julia the Elder and the execution of a number of prominent Roman senators saw him granted a suffect consulship on 1 December, replacing Gaius Fufius Geminus, who may also have been caught up in the political crisis. If this was so, then Augustus saw Fabricius as a man whose loyalty was unwavering during this time of crisis.

There is nothing further known about his career, either before or after his suffect consulship.

Family
He was married to a woman named Polla Antonia.

See also
 List of Roman consuls

References

Sources
Syme, Ronald, The Augustan Aristocracy (1986)] Clarendon Press. 

1st-century BC Romans
Senators of the Roman Empire
Suffect consuls of Imperial Rome
Fabricii
Year of birth unknown
Year of death unknown